Phelsuma parkeri, commonly known as Parker's day gecko or the Pemba Island day gecko, is a diurnal species of lizard in the family Gekkonidae. The species is endemic to Pemba Island, Tanzania, and typically inhabits banana trees and dwellings. The Pemba Island day gecko feeds on insects and nectar.

Etymology
Both the specific name, parkeri, and one of the common names, Parker's day gecko, are in honor of English herpetologist Hampton Wildman Parker.

Description
Parker's day gecko is a slender lizard and a mid-size day gecko. The body colour is bright green. A faint red stripe extends from the nostril to the eye. On the back and limbs tiny black spots and speckles are present. This species has yellow eye rings. The ventral side is white.

Distribution

Habitat
Phelsuma parkeri is often found on different large trees such as banana trees and palms. This species also lives near or on human dwellings.

Diet
Parker's day gecko feeds on various insects and other invertebrates. It also licks soft, sweet fruit, pollen and nectar.

Behaviour
The Pemba Island day gecko is quite shy and stays so, even in captivity.

Reproduction
The females of P. parkeri are colony nesters and many eggs can be found at one location.

Care and maintenance in captivity
Parker's day geckos should be housed in pairs. They need a large, well planted terrarium. The temperature should be about  during the day. The humidity should be maintained around 65–75% during the day and slightly higher at night. In captivity, these animals can be fed with crickets, wax moth larvae, fruit flies, mealworms, and houseflies.

References

Further reading
 Henkel F-W, Schmidt W (1995). Amphibien und Reptilien Madagaskars, der Maskarenen, Seychellen und Komoren. Stuttgart: Ulmer. .
 Loveridge A (1941). "New Geckos (Phelsuma and Lygodactylus), Snake (Leptotyphlops), and Frog (Phrynobatrachus) from Pemba Island, East Africa". Proc. Biol. Soc. Washington 54: 175–178. (Phelsuma madagascariensis parkeri, new subspecies, pp. 175–176).
 McKeown S (1993). The General Care and Maintenance of Day Geckos. Lakeside, California: Advanced Vivarium Systems.

Pemba Island
parkeri
Reptiles described in 1941
Endemic fauna of Tanzania
Reptiles of Tanzania
Geckos of Africa
Taxa named by Arthur Loveridge